Abramowicz, Abramovich, Abramowitz, and Abramovitz are variant spellings of a name meaning "son of Abraham" among Slavic language speaking peoples; it is a common surname amongst Ashkenazi Jews,  for whom it is commonly Hebraized to Ben-Avraham (בן-אברהם) upon immigration to Israel. It was also one of the many surnames of which were historically given by the returning Crusaders to their children, in recognition of their father's visit to the Middle East.

The surname Abramovich is not related to the  Christian surname Abramović.

Some people with these names include:

Abramowicz (Polish)
 Lisa Abramowicz, American television and radio host
 Michel Abramowicz (1950-), French cinematographer
 Danny Abramowicz (1945-), American football player
 Halina Abramowicz, Professor of Physics, Tel Aviv University and Max Planck Institute
 Kazimierz Abramowicz (1889–1936), Polish mathematician
 Manuel Abramowicz (born 1967), Belgian reporter
 Michał Abramowicz (1884–1965), Russian and Soviet geologist
 Hirsz Abramowicz (1881–1960), prominent Yiddish historian and writer
 Yehuda Meir Abramowicz, (1914–2007), Israeli rabbi and politician
 Andrzej Abramowicz (died 1763) was a Polish-Lithuanian nobleman.
 Tomasz Abramowicz (born 15 February 1979 in Ełk) is a Polish professional football player
 Witold Abramowicz, a Polish scientist

Abramovich (: surname — Абра́мович: patronymic)
 Alexander Abramovich (Alexander "Sasha" Argov; 1914–95), Russian-born Israeli composer
 Boris Abramovich Berezovsky (1946–2013) Russian business oligarch, government official and mathematician.
 Daniel Abramovich Chwolson, Russian Jewish Orientalist
 David Abramovich Dragunsky (1910–1992)
 Gavril Abramovich Ilizarov (1921–1992), Soviet physician
 Luis Abramovich (born 1962), Argentine footballer
 Mario Abramovich (1926–2014), Argentine musician
 Roman Abramovich (born 1966), Russian billionaire and former owner of Chelsea Football Club
 Semyon Abramovich Furman (1920–1978), Soviet chessmaster
 Vsevolod Abramovich (1890–1913), Russian aviator
 Yuri Abramovich (1935–2017), Soviet/Russian aircraft pilot and Hero of Russia
 Vladimir Abramovich Rokhlin (1919–1984), mathematician
 Ary Abramovich Sternfeld (1905–1990), aerospace engineer
 David Abramovich Tyshler (1927–2014), Ukrainian/Soviet Olympic bronze medalist fencer

Abramovitch
 Raphael Abramovitch (1880–1963), Russian socialist

Abramovitz

 Max Abramovitz (1908–2004), American architect

 Moses Abramovitz (1912–2000), American economist and professor
 S. Y. Abramovitz aka Mendele Mocher Sforim (1836–1917), Jewish author from Belarus

Abramowitz
 Chaim Zanvl Abramowitz (1902–1995), American Hasidic rebbe
 Dov Ber Abramowitz (1860–1926), American Rabbi
 Pinchas Abramowitz, (1909–1986), Israeli artist
 Milton Abramowitz (1915–1958), American mathematician
 Sid Abramowitz (1960-), American football player
 Morton I. Abramowitz (born 1933), American diplomat
 Yosef Abramowitz (born 1964), Israeli businessman

See also 
 Abramović

Ibrahimović

References 

Belarusian-language surnames
Jewish surnames
Polish-language surnames
Slavic-language surnames
Patronymic surnames